The Cowper and Newton Museum is a museum in Olney, Buckinghamshire, England, in the City of Milton Keynes. Celebrating the work and lives of two famous local residents: William Cowper (1731–1800), a celebrated 18th-century poet; and John Newton (1725–1807), a prominent slave trader (and subsequent abolitionist) who was curate in the local church. Together, Cowper and Newton wrote the Olney Hymns, including one of the world's most popular hymns, "Amazing Grace".

The museum is housed in a large red-brick Georgian house, called Orchard Side, on the corner of Market Place in Olney.

History
The Museum building is original to the Georgian era and is presented as it would have been when William Cowper was its resident in 1768 to 1786.
Within the Museum's collections are the literary works and personal effects of William Cowper, showing a detailed insight into Georgian life and a fine collection of lace and local history artefacts. The history of Olney is also presented in the Olney Rooms within the museum.

It has two unique gardens of outstanding horticultural interest as they are planted only with specimens introduced to England before 1800.

The museum first opened in 1900.

The Flower Garden & Summerhouse Garden
Originally the Summerhouse Garden belonged to the apothecary who lived next door to Orchard Side. After Thomas Aspray's death, Cowper was allowed the use of this former medicinal and herbal garden. Selected friends were allowed to visit him in the unique building in the centre of the garden, which he described as his ‘verse manufacturey’. After the poet's death in 1800, admirers of his works visited this small ‘literary shrine’ and many inscribed their names and dates on the walls and ceiling - the earliest found being 1802! - all of which can still be seen today.

Other
The vicarage is close by, where Cowper's friend and clergyman John Newton (1725–1807), wrote the hymn Amazing Grace. Newton and his wife are buried in the local churchyard.

The museum is promoted by the Campaign to Protect Rural England. and is a charitable trust run almost entirely by volunteers.

See also 
 List of museums in Buckinghamshire

References

External links 
 Museum website
 Visit Olney information
 BritainExpress information
 Olney Chamber information

Museums established in 1900
Biographical museums in Buckinghamshire
Local museums in Buckinghamshire
Buildings and structures in Milton Keynes
1900 establishments in England
Olney, Buckinghamshire